The 2003 Slough Borough Council election was held on 1 May 2003, at the same time as other local elections across England and Scotland. Fourteen of the 41 seats on Slough Borough Council were up for election, being the usual third of the council.

Results
The elected councillors were:

Notes:-
 Member of the Britwellian, Independent, Liberal and Liberal Democrat Group (ILLD then BILLD) (after the 2000 election)
 (a) Stokes: Formerly served as a Labour councillor 1983–1986
 (b) Cryer: Formerly served as a councillor 1967–1974
 (c) Long: Formerly served as a councillor 1983–1990
 (d) Haines: Formerly served as a Labour councillor 1987–1991 and 1992–1998

References

Slough
2003 English local elections
2003